Long Night or The Long Night may refer to:

Film and television
The Long Night (1947 film), a film noir
The Long Night (2022 film), an American horror film
"Long Night", an episode of Please Teacher!
"The Long Night" (Babylon 5), a 1997 episode from the science fiction series' fourth season
"The Long Night" (Game of Thrones), a season 8 episode of the fantasy drama television series
"The Long Night", a 2011 episode of the British drama Camelot
"The Long Night", a 2008 episode of the British sitcom Outnumbered

Literature
The Long Night (1958), a  novel by Julian Mayfield
The Long Night (1903), a novel by Stanley J. Weyman

Music
Long Night (album), a 1961 album by Frank Strozier
"Long Night" (Kim Hyung-jun song), 2011
"Long Night" (The Corrs song), 2004
"Long Night", a song by Eddy Grant, from the album Reparation